= List of Coritiba Foot Ball Club presidents =

Coritiba Foot Ball Club is a football club based in Curitiba, Paraná that competes in the Campeonato Brasileiro Série A, the most senior football league in Brazil. Since its founding in 1909, the club has had 37 different presidents.

== List of presidents ==
Below is the official presidential history of Coritiba F.C., from when João Viana Seiler until Vilson Ribeiro de Andrade, the current president.

Presidents
Name	Period
João Viana Seiler	1909-11
Leopoldo Obladen	1912
João Viana Seiler	1913-14
Frederico Essenfelder	1915
Constante Fruet	1916-17
Cândido Guedes Chagas	1918
Epaminondas Santos	1919
Roberto Emilio Naujoks	1920
João Viana Seiler	1921
João Meister Sobrinho	1922-25
Constante Fruet	1926
Antônio Couto Pereira	1927-28
Jocelyn de Souza Lopes	1929
Pedro Nolasco Pizzatto	1930
Antônio Couto Pereira	1931-34
João Viana Seiler	1935
Bernardo Leinig	1936
Antônio Couto Pereira	1937-45
Plácido Mattana	1945
Lauro Schleder	1946
Antônio da Silva Pereira	1947
Tércio Rolim de Moura	1948
Agostinho Pereira Alves	1949
Ulysses Moro	1949
Lauro Schleder	1950
Reinaldo Dacheux Pereira	1951
Amâncio Moro	1952-53
Antônio Anibelli	1954-55
Aryon Cornelsen	1956-63
Antônio Pattittuci	1963
Michel Zaidan	1963
Reinaldo Dacheux Pereira	1964-65
Leonardo Costódio	1965
Lincoln Hey	1966-67
Evangelino da Costa Neves	1967-79
Amauri Cruz Santos	1980
Edison José Mauad	1980-81
Evangelino da Costa Neves	1982-87
Bayard Rachawski Osna	1988-89
João Jacob Mehl	1990-91
Evangelino da Costa Neves	1992-95
Edison José Mauad	1995-96
Joel Malucelli	1996-97
João Jacob Mehl	1998-99
Sérgio Marcos Prosdócimo	2000-01
Francisco Alberto de Araújo	2001-02
Giovani Gionédis	2002-07
Jair Cirino dos Santos	2008-11
Vilson Ribeiro de Andrade	2012-

== See also ==
- Coritiba Foot Ball Club
- Campeonato Brasileiro de 1985
